Efland is a census-designated place in Orange County, North Carolina, United States. As of the 2010 census it had a population of 734.

It is served by exit 160 from Interstate 85. The original name of the Efland community was Green Springs.

Efland Ruritan Club hosts most of the CDP's activities, including an annual rodeo and the 4th of July and Christmas parades. The club was charted on December 7, 1981, and Ben Lloyd (former County Commissioner and Farmer) was its first president.

Efland has two schools, Efland-Cheeks Elementary School and Gravelly Hill Middle School. Located next to Gravelly Hill MS on West Ten Road is an Orange County soccer facility. The Soccer.Com Center offers 5 full size soccer fields, 1 practice soccer field, a walking track, a concession building and restroom facilities.

The David Faucette House was listed on the National Register of Historic Places in 1999.

Demographics

References

External links
Efland information
Efland Ruritan Club
Efland Chamber of Commerce

Census-designated places in Orange County, North Carolina
Census-designated places in North Carolina